Khursand (also romanized as Khūrsand; also known as Khorsand) is a city in the Central District of Shahr-e Babak County, Kerman Province, Iran.  At the 2006 census its population was 7,847, in 1,663 families.

References

Populated places in Shahr-e Babak County

Cities in Kerman Province